Qu Bo (1923–2002) was a Chinese novelist. His name was also translated as Chu Po. Qǔ, the family name, has meanings of curve, melody and tune. Bō stands for ripples and waves. His first book Tracks in the Snowy Forest (林海雪原) made him one of the most popular authors at the time.

Life
Born in Zaolinzhuang Village, Huang County (now Longkou), at the north-east coast of Shandong province, Qu Bo's early education was through a private school where he started to gain his sound knowledge of Chinese classical literature and succinct language skills. His father, Qu Chunyang and mother, Qu Liushi owned a small business of cotton dyeing, which failed when western textiles poured into China.

In 1938, at the age of 15, he left home and fought in the war against the Japanese invasion (Second Sino-Japanese War). His name was changed from his childhood name Qu Qingtao into Qu Bo by the officials of the Eighth Route Army. Qu Bo had further education at the Counter-Japanese Military and Political University in Shandong and became a journalist of an army newspaper, The Progress. The army turned into the People's Liberation Army after the Japanese surrendered, and Qu Bo continued to battle in the Chinese civil war in the northeast of China, protecting the regional civilians from robbery and killings by the regional bandits and brigands. In the army, he served as a young literacy teacher, a political commissar and finally a colonel. In 1946 he married Liu Bo who was a head nurse of a hospital at the same army regional headquarters.

During the communist regime after 1949, Qu Bo worked in the railway industry and the Ministry of Machinery until his retirement, and lived in Beijing for the rest of his life.

Qu Bo was an active member of the China Writers'Association, and was recognised as a Chinese contemporary writer in the history of Chinese Literature.  He had, however, never stopped his full-time industrial management jobs and only wrote books and articles during his spare time.  He visited Russia, Pakistan and England as an author as well as industrial director. His novels were made into films, Beijing Opera musicals and TV shows.

Qu Bo's Family: See 曲波 (作家) in Chinese Wikipedia

Qu Leilei, Artist and member of Xingxing (Stars ) group, is one of his son. QU LEI LEI is an internationally renowned artist, mainly as a painter and draftsman.
He was born in the Heilongjiang province, China, and grew up during the political and turbulence of the Chinese cultural revolution. He is currently based in London but works between London, Devon and Beijing.
QU Lei Lei is a founding member of the ‚Stars‘ movement, a group of art students who set up the first ever contemporary art movement to appear in China between 1979 and 1983. Their campaign for freedom of expression breaks the stranglehold of the Communist Party orthodoxy and opens the path for freedom of artistic expression in China.
QU Lei Lei first exhibits in China and then at the Venice Biennale, the Beijing Biennale and the Pompidou Centre in Paris.
QU Lei Lei's works are displayed in the Ashmolean Museum in London as well as in Oxford and form part of the permanent collections of the China National Museum. Some of his art works have recently been acquired by the British Museum and the Victoria and Albert Museum (V&A).
QU Lei Lei builds bridges between cultures by his extraordinary mastery of ink on paper, be it for his Hands, like painters of the Dutch school or from the Italian renaissance; for his nudes, like modern French painters; and for his Chinese soldiers. All his art works exude intelligence and humanity.

Bibliography

Novels
Tracks in the Snowy Forest (林海雪原)(1957), People's Literature Publishing House 人民文学出版社.  A thrilling tale of a small group of selected soldiers who went into the snowy mountains searching and fighting dangerous hidden bandits and brigands.
The book was translated into English, Russian, Japanese, Korean, Vietnamese, Mongolian, Norwegian and Arabic. A film adaptation of the novel was made in 1960. A later film adaptation titled The Taking of Tiger Mountain was released December 23, 2014.

Roar of the Mountains and the Seas (1977), China Youth Press 中国青年出版社. An adventure story and romance set in Shandong Province during the Second Sino-Japanese War. The writing was completed before the Cultural Revolution and the publication was delayed for more than 10 years.

Qiao Longbiao (1979), People's Literature Press 人民文学出版社. A tale of a patriotic hero who was later enlisted into the communist forces during the war against Japanese. The book was completed before the Cultural Revolution, but again the publication was delayed for more than 10 years. 
 
Stele of Rong E (1977), Shandong People's Publishing House 山东人民出版社. A story reflecting the importance of Chinese women in the war against Japanese.

Short Stories
Mostly about daily life in an industrial frontier, e.g. (1959), (1960).

Prose
Mostly travel writings and features (1962) (1994).

Poetry
Mostly in the Chinese classical style.

References

External links
 
Tracks in the Snowy Forest in Chinese Wikipedia
Qu Bo (Writer) in Chinese Wikipedia
Profile of Qu Bo in the dictionary of Members of the Chinese Writers' Association

1923 births
2002 deaths
Writers from Yantai
20th-century novelists
Chinese male novelists
20th-century Chinese male writers
People's Republic of China novelists